Bellbowrie is a suburb in the City of Brisbane, Queensland, Australia. In the  Bellbowrie had a population of 5,462 people.

It is a rapidly developing semi-rural area due to Brisbane's growth heading in a westwards direction.

Geography
The suburb is bounded to the north by Pullen Pullen Creek and to the east by the Brisbane River with two of its reaches: 

 Pullen Reach (downstream )
Goggs Reach (upstream )

Moggill Road, which bisects the suburb, is a main thoroughfare for traffic passing from Ipswich to central Brisbane. Commuters may use the Moggill Ferry to gain access to Moggill Road as an alternative to the Centenary Highway.  Neighbouring suburbs include: Moggill, Pullenvale, Pinjarra Hills and Anstead.

The streetscape in Bellbowrie benefits from the provision of underground power and there are few power poles to be seen.

Bellbowrie is part of the Pullenvale Ward for Brisbane City Council Elections as well as the seat of Moggill for the Sunshine State of Queensland elections and the seat of Ryan for Federal elections.

History
The name Bellbowrie is an Aboriginal word (possibly from the Hunter River area in New South Wales) meaning ''flowering gum'', possibly referring to the red gum. It was named on 4 November 1972 and bounded on 11 August 1975.

The initial subdivisions in the area were commenced in the early 1970s.  Development slowed in the aftermath of the 1974 Brisbane flood which saw much of the eastern, lower-lying areas of the suburb badly inundated with water. Since the construction of the Wivenhoe Dam in the 1980s the fear of floods was reduced and development increased. Many acreage owners are subdividing their properties and as a consequence, and significant areas of bushland are being cleared.  

The boundaries of the suburb were extended on 13 December 1990 to include land previously in Anstead.

Several new housing estates began development in 2001 on land that used to be pineapple farms.

In the 2011 Brisbane floods, the Brisbane River rose significantly and some small areas of Bellbowrie were flooded. However, of greater concern was the inundation of access roads to the area, isolating a number of suburbs including Bellbowrie including the loss of electricity and telecommunications and a shortage of food with the supermarket inundated. The Uniting Church acted as an evacuation centre for those whose homes were flooded and as a communal food bank which received supplies of necessities via helicopter.

In the  Bellbowrie had a population of 5,413 people.

In the  Bellbowrie had a population of 5,462 people.

Moggill Cemetery

Moggill Cemetery is located on the eastern side of Moggill Road, Bellbowrie in subdivision 2 of portions 7 & 8, County of Stanley, Parish of Moggill. In March 1851, the original land owner, Joseph Lewis, purchased portions 7 & 8. It is believed portions 7 & 8 was used as church graveyard, circa 1855, only clues remain as to the exact location of the associated, possibly Methodist, chapel. George Mounser, who accidentally drowned at Moggill on 4 March 1855, is assumed to have been the first person buried in the graveyard.

In 1865, the land was sanctioned as a cemetery. In June 1921, the Queensland Governor, Sir Matthew Nathan, ordered that the cemetery be permanently reserved and placed under the control of trustees: John Anstead, John Bird, Maurice William Doyle, Norman Charles Robert Sexton and Frederick Charles Sugars. In February 1922, the land was resumed by the Crown. In July 1930, the Governor, Sir Thomas Herbert Goodwin, passed control of Moggill Cemetery over to the Brisbane City Council).

Education 
There are no schools in Bellbowrie. The nearest government primary schools are Moggill State School in neighbouring Moggill to the south. The nearest government secondary school in Kenmore State High School in Kenmore to the north-east.

Amenities 
Bellbowrie has an abundance of recreational facilities such as many off-leash areas for dogs to play in.  The suburb also borders the Brisbane River and some residents have boat ramps in order to access it.

Bellbowrie is serviced by a weekly visit of the Brisbane City Council's mobile library service in the Bellbowrie Shopping Plaza carpark, off Birkin Road.

Bellbowrie Community Church (formerly Kenmore Community Church) is at 3077 Moggill Road.

A number of community groups are active in the area, including:

 Rural Environmental Planning Association Inc.
 Rural Environmental Planning Association Inc.
 Moggill Girl Guides
 Moggill Scout Group

Bellbowrie is part of the Tyakunda Scout District, Tyakunda being an Aboriginal word meaning land of the rolling hills. The local Scout group is called "Moggill Scout Group", and is named so as Moggill was the original name of the area and meet at 17 Mahonia Street.

The Moggill branch of the Queensland Country Women's Association meets at the Bellbowrie Community Church at 3077 Moggill Road.

Sporting clubs
The Bellbowrie Sports & Recreation Club Inc., known locally as the "sports & rec" or "the club", located in Sugarwood Street, is the home ground of several sporting clubs:

 Bellbowrie "Strikers" Hockey Club Inc.
 Moggill Football Club Inc.
 Moggill Cricket Club
 Moggill "Mustangs" Junior Australian Football Club.
The Bellbowrie Sports & Recreation Club Inc.  also has a skate park, cricket nets and a multiple use tennis and basketball court (which is no longer left open for all hours access and free public use).

A Brisbane City Council public swimming pool, by award-winning architects bureau^proberts  is located in Sugarwood Street and hosts the Bellbowrie Swimming Club.

References

External links

 
 
 

Suburbs of the City of Brisbane